Tuas Power Ltd is one of the largest power generation companies and a key provider of energy solutions, multi-utilities and environmental services in Singapore.

In March 2008, the company was acquired by SinoSing Power Pte. Ltd, a wholly owned subsidiary of energy conglomerate China Huaneng Group(CHNG), from Temasek Holdings for S$4.235 billion. Following the transfer of 100% equity interest in SinoSing Power from CHNG to Huaneng Power International, Inc. (HPI), Tuas Power became a fully owned subsidiary of HPI in July 2008.

Business
Tuas Power's core business lies in the generation, retailing and trading of electricity. It operates a 2670MW power station, which is located in the Tuas industrial area of Singapore, through its wholly owned subsidiary Tuas Power Generation Pte Ltd. The power station, which houses four 367.5MW Combined Cycle Plants and two 600MW steam plants, contributes about 25 per cent of Singapore's total power supply. Electricity is sold to commercial customers through Tuas Power's retail arm, Tuas Power Supply Pte Ltd.

The company has also expanded its businesses into related fields such as the provision of multi-utility services and oil terminalling and storage services. Presently, it is building a S$2 billion multi-utility complex, which comprises a Biomass-Clean Coal cogeneration plant, a desalination plant, a wastewater treatment plant and other supporting facilities, in the Tembusu area of Jurong Island.

References

Electric power companies of Singapore